The striated babbler (Argya earlei) is a species of bird in the family Leiothrichidae. It is found in southern Asia from Pakistan to Myanmar.

This species was formerly placed in the genus Turdoides but following the publication of a comprehensive molecular phylogenetic study in 2018, it was moved to the resurrected genus Argya.

References

Collar, N. J. & Robson, C. 2007. Family Timaliidae (Babblers)  pp. 70 – 291 in; del Hoyo, J., Elliott, A. & Christie, D.A. eds. Handbook of the Birds of the World, Vol. 12. Picathartes to Tits and Chickadees. Lynx Edicions, Barcelona.

striated babbler
Birds of Pakistan
Birds of India
Birds of Bangladesh
Birds of Myanmar
striated babbler
striated babbler
Taxonomy articles created by Polbot